In the United States, the informal political term "czar" or "tsar" is employed in media and popular usage to refer to high-level officials who oversee a particular policy. There have never been any U.S. government offices with the title "czar", but various governmental officials have sometimes been referred to by the nickname "czar" rather than their actual title.

The earliest known use of the term for a U.S. government official was in the administration of Franklin Roosevelt (1933–1945), during which eleven unique positions (or twelve if one were to count "Economic Czar" and "Economic Czar of World War II" as separate) were so described. The term was revived, mostly by the press, to describe officials in the Richard Nixon and Gerald Ford administrations, and continues today.

By administration 
The list is subjective and imprecise, since frequently individuals or offices might be referred to by the nickname "czar" by some publication or a political opponent, yet the actual governmental official, a majority of publications and others do not use the term. One possible definition is only those officials who are appointed by the president without Senate confirmation.

The numbers are based upon the sortable list below. Please see it for details and references. Note that what is measured is the popularity of the word czar, rather than an objective measure of authority.

Also note that under George W. Bush only 33 Czar titles had been currently found, thus only 33 Czars, although many of these titles were used by several distinct individuals. For example, there has been an Assistant Secretary of Labor for Mine Safety and Health since the passage of the Mine Safety and Health Act of 1977, but the phrase "mine safety czar" was only applied to the position since the controversial appointment of Richard Stickler to the post in 2006. Similarly, there has been a director of the Office of Information and Regulatory Affairs since the office was created by the Paperwork Reduction Act of 1980, but the term "regulatory czar" was not applied to the post until 2001.

List of executive branch czars
The following are executive branch officials who have been described by the media as a czar of some kind.

See also
Advice and consent
Politics of the United States during World War II
War as metaphor

References 

Czars